Elections to the Nagaland Legislative Assembly were held in February 1993 to elect members of the 60 constituencies in Nagaland, India. The Indian National Congress won the most seats and S. C. Jamir was appointed as the Chief Minister of Nagaland for the third time. The number of constituencies was set as 60 by the recommendation of the Delimitation Commission of India.

Result

Elected Members

See also
List of constituencies of the Nagaland Legislative Assembly

References

1993 in Nagaland
Nagaland
State Assembly elections in Nagaland
1993